Ramiro Andrés López (born 31 October 1984) is an Argentine professional footballer who plays as an attacking midfielder for San Telmo.

Career
El Porvenir were López's opening senior club, which preceded a move to Argentine Primera División side Almagro in 2005. He went on to make twenty-seven appearances for them, with the majority falling in the subsequent two years in Primera B Nacional. López had two spells with Sportivo Italiano in 2007 and 2009, either side of a stint in Primera B Metropolitana with Defensores de Belgrano. 2010 saw López join Deportivo Morón, with the midfielder scoring five goals in fifteen games before departing six months later to sign for Deportivo Merlo on 30 June. He scored fourteen times in two seasons with the team.

Patronato signed López in July 2012, before Sarmiento did the same the following year. On 30 June 2014, López joined Primera B Nacional's San Martín. They won promotion to the Primera División in his first season, with him scoring on his top-flight debut for the club against Godoy Cruz on 14 February 2015. Fellow Primera División outfit Arsenal de Sarandí completed the signing of López in July, with the player leaving twelve months later to Los Andes of Primera B Nacional. A move to Villa Dálmine followed, before López rejoined Arsenal de Sarandí on 30 June 2018. His bow came on 25 August versus Gimnasia y Esgrima.

On 7 June 2019, after achieving promotion as champions to the Primera División with Arsenal, López agreed to leave after joining newly-promoted Primera B Nacional team Barracas Central.

Career statistics
.

Honours
Arsenal de Sarandí
Primera B Nacional: 2018–19

References

External links

1984 births
Living people
People from Avellaneda Partido
Argentine footballers
Association football midfielders
Primera Nacional players
Argentine Primera División players
Primera B Metropolitana players
El Porvenir footballers
Club Almagro players
Sportivo Italiano footballers
Defensores de Belgrano footballers
Deportivo Morón footballers
Deportivo Merlo footballers
Club Atlético Patronato footballers
Club Atlético Sarmiento footballers
San Martín de San Juan footballers
Arsenal de Sarandí footballers
Club Atlético Los Andes footballers
Villa Dálmine footballers
Barracas Central players
San Telmo footballers
Sportspeople from Buenos Aires Province